Bartolovec is a village in Varaždin County, Croatia.

The village is part of the Trnovec Bartolovečki municipality. It is located near Lake Varaždin, a reservoir on the Drava, around 6 kilometres east of the city of Varaždin. It is connected with the villages of Žabnik and Štefanec. In the 2011 census, Bartolovec had a population of 749.

The D2 state road goes through the village.

References

Populated places in Varaždin County